Shan Shek Wan is the name of several places in Hong Hong, including:
 Shan Shek Wan, South Lantau, a village in the south of Lantau island
 Shan Shek Wan, North Lantau, a village in the north of Lantau island